Phyllonorycter sagitella is a moth of the family Gracillariidae. It is found from Fennoscandia and northern Russia to the Pyrenees, Italy and Romania and from Great Britain to southern Russia.

The wingspan is 8.5-9.5 mm. There are two generations per year, with larvae in June and again from August to October, and adults on wing in May and again in July and August.

The larvae feed on Populus tremula. They mine the leaves of their host plant. They create a lower surface oval tentiform mine without a fixed position on the leaf. The mine is yellowish, sometimes tinged with red and turns black when old. The frass is stacked in one corner of the mine. The pupa is almost black and made in a very flimsy cocoon.

External links
Fauna Europaea
Leafminers and plant galls of Europe 
Lepiforum.de
UK Moths

sagitella
Moths of Europe
Moths of Asia
Moths described in 1790